Ivan Vasilyevich Privalov (born in 1902 in Kharkiv; died in 1974 in Kharkiv) was a Ukrainian football player.

Honours
 USSR Champion: 1924.

International career
Privalov made his debut for USSR on 16 November 1924 in a friendly against Turkey along with Oleksandr Shpakovsky from FC Sturm Kharkiv (the Soviet Union won 3:0). He also participated in six other unofficial games against Turkey amateurs from 1925–1933.

External links
  Profile

1902 births
1974 deaths
Footballers from Kharkiv
People from Kharkov Governorate
Ukrainian footballers
Soviet footballers
Soviet football referees
FC Dynamo Kharkiv players
Soviet Union international footballers
Association football midfielders